Dame Margot (fl. 13th century) was a trouvère from Arras, in Picardy, France. One extant work of hers is jeu parti, a debate song, in which she debates Dame Maroie. This song, "Je vous pri, dame Maroie," survives in two manuscripts, which each give separate and unrelated melodies. In another jeu parti she is a judge, opposing Jehan le Cuvelier d'Arras and Jehan Bretel. She is listed as a member of the Puy d'Arras.

References

Sources

Maria V. Coldwell. "Margot, Dame, and Maroie, Dame", Grove Music Online, ed. L. Macy (accessed October 21, 2006), grovemusic.com  (subscription access).

Margot
Margot
Margot
13th-century French women writers
13th-century French poets